L'Étoile du Nord is a French phrase meaning "The Star of the North". It is the motto of the U.S. state of Minnesota, and the only U.S. state motto in French. It was chosen by the state's first governor, Henry Hastings Sibley, and was adopted in 1861, three years after admission of Minnesota to the union. The land that became Minnesota was the northernmost section in the Northwest Territory, and Minnesota is the northernmost state in the contiguous United States. Because of this motto, one of Minnesota's nicknames is The North Star State. The Minnesota North Stars ice hockey team chose the English translation for their name. 

In the northern hemisphere, the North Star (Polaris) is a part of the tip of the handle and the brightest star of the constellation Ursa Minor (known also as Little Bear and as the Little Dipper). Ursa Minor has traditionally been important for navigation, because of Polaris being the star that is closest to the North Celestial Pole.

Examples at the Minnesota State Capitol
The motto and eight-pointed star can be seen throughout the state capitol.

Examples at the Minnesota History Center
The eight-pointed star can be seen in the ceiling of the Great Hall and throughout the building. Each pair of points represents the letter M for Minnesota.

See also
List of place names of French origin in the United States

References

French words and phrases
State mottos of the United States
Symbols of Minnesota
1861 establishments in Minnesota